David Aiken Reed (December 21, 1880February 10, 1953) was an American lawyer and Republican party politician from Pittsburgh, Pennsylvania. He represented Pennsylvania in the United States Senate from 1922 to 1935.

He was a co-author of the restrictive Immigration Act of 1924, also known as the Johnson–Reed Act.

Early life and education
David Aiken Reed was born on December 21, 1880 in Pittsburgh, Pennsylvania to James Hay Reed, a Pittsburgh lawyer and federal judge, and Katherine Jones (Aiken) Reed. He graduated from Shady Side Academy, a Pittsburgh prep school, in 1896. 

He then obtained his college education at Princeton University, from which he graduated with a Bachelor of Arts degree in 1900. He earned a Bachelor of Laws from the University of Pittsburgh Law School in 1903 and was admitted to the bar during the same year.

Legal career and military service 
He practiced law from 1903 to 1917 in Pittsburgh, also serving as chairman of the Pennsylvania Industrial Accidents Commission, until serving as a major in field artillery in World War I until 1919, after which he resumed practicing law. In the military he received the Victory Medal, The Distinguished Service Medal and the France Order Legion Honor Knight Cross. He also was the post commander for VFW East Liberty Post number 5 Department of Pennsylvania. His dog tag reads "David A. Reed Major 311th Field Artillery U.S.A."

United States Senate 
Reed, a Republican, was appointed to the United States Senate on August 8, 1922, to fill a vacancy created by the death of William E. Crow. He was subsequently elected on November 7, 1922, to serve for the remainder of Crow's term and a six-year term in his own right, beginning in March 1923. 

Along with Congressman Albert Johnson, Senator Reed was a co-author of the Immigration Act of 1924, the purpose of which was to restrict the movement of Eastern and Southern Europeans into the United States, and prohibit Asian immigration in its entirety. 

Reed served as chairman of the Committee on Expenditures in Executive Departments and Committee on Military Affairs. He was reelected in 1928, but was unsuccessful in seeking reelection in 1934. Frustrated with Congressional inaction in response to the Great Depression, in a July 1, 1932, Senate speech, Reed said: “I do not often envy other countries and their governments, but I say that if this country ever needed a Mussolini, it needs one now.” He was also a Member of the American Liberty League. His tenure in the U.S. Senate ended with the expiration of his term on January 3, 1935.

After the Senate 
After serving in the U.S. Senate, Reed resumed practicing law in Pittsburgh until his death on February 10, 1953, in Sarasota, Florida. He was interred in Arlington National Cemetery in Arlington, Virginia.

His house on 2222 S Street NW in the Kalorama neighborhood of Washington DC, designed by Carrere & Hastings and built in 1929, survives as the Embassy of Laos.

References

External links

David Aiken Reed Scrapbooks at Seeley G. Mudd Library, Princeton University

1880 births
1953 deaths
Politicians from Pittsburgh
University of Pittsburgh School of Law alumni
United States Army personnel of World War I
Pennsylvania Republicans
Republican Party United States senators from Pennsylvania
Princeton University alumni
Shady Side Academy alumni
20th-century American politicians
People from Kalorama (Washington, D.C.)
Old Right (United States)